Tivetshall St Margaret is a village and former civil parish, now in the parish of Tivetshall, in the South Norfolk district, in the county of Norfolk, England. On the 1st of April 2019 the parish was merged with Tivetshall St Mary to form Tivetshall.

The villages name means 'Nook of land'. It has been suggested that the first element may be related to a late northern English dialectical, 'tewhit' meaning 'lapwing'. 'St. Margaret' from the church dedication.

The church 
The church of St. Margaret has a tympanum painted with the Royal Arms of Elizabeth I,  some of the earliest in England, dating from 1587. The huge arms, which stretch across the church, from wall to wall and from the top of the roodscreen to the roof, are flanked by the lion and the dragon. Beneath is painted "God Save Our Quene Elizabeth". The design includes the symbols of the other four Tudor monarchs, as well as the badge of Anne Boleyn, Elizabeth's own mother.

Beneath the arms, which have been recently restored, are Ten Commandments.

See also
 Tivetshall railway station

Notes

External links 

 Tivetshall St. Margaret at genuki.org

Villages in Norfolk
Former civil parishes in Norfolk
South Norfolk